Austria was represented by Petra Frey in the Eurovision Song Contest 1994 with the song "Für den Frieden der Welt".

Before Eurovision

National final 
The final was held at the Nachtwerk Nightclub in Vienna on 8 March 1994, hosted by Alfons Haider. The winner was chosen by the votes of 9 regional juries.

At Eurovision

Voting

References

External links
Austrian National Final 1994

1994
Countries in the Eurovision Song Contest 1994
Eurovision